Romans d'Isonzo is a comune (municipality) in  the Italian region Friuli-Venezia Giulia, located about  northwest of Trieste and about  southwest of Gorizia.

Romans d'Isonzo borders the following municipalities: Gradisca d'Isonzo, Mariano del Friuli, Medea, San Vito al Torre, Tapogliano, Villesse.

References 

Cities and towns in Friuli-Venezia Giulia